Sinocyclocheilus gracilis is a species of ray-finned fish in the genus Sinocyclocheilus.

References 

gracilis
Fish described in 2014